Everyone Loves You When You're Dead: Journeys into Fame and Madness is a book by the American author Neil Strauss released on March 15, 2011. A New York Times bestseller, the book is a compilation of more than 200 interviews from the author's career as a pop culture journalist.

To construct the book, Strauss visited his original interview recordings, notes, and transcripts and selected the often unpublished moments from the three thousand-something interviews conducted for various periodicals.

References

2011 non-fiction books